The King Jagiełło Monument is an equestrian monument of Władysław II Jagiełło, King of Poland and Grand Duke of Lithuania, located in Central Park, New York City. The monument commemorates the Battle of Grunwald, a decisive defeat of the Teutonic Order in 1410. Originally made for the Polish 1939 New York World's Fair pavilion, the monument was permanently installed in Central Park in 1945. Raised on its grand plinth it is one of the most prominently sited and impressive of twenty-nine sculptures located in the park.

Description
The monument is sited overlooking the east end of the Turtle Pond, across from Belvedere Castle and just south-east from the Great Lawn. To the northeast is Cleopatra's Needle and beyond, the Metropolitan Museum of Art.

The monument commemorates the Battle of Grunwald (1410), where Polish and Lithuanian knights supported by Ruthenian, Czech, and Tatar knights defeated the Teutonic Order. King Władysław II Jagiello is shown seated on a horse holding two crossed swords over his head as a symbol of defiance and of the union of Polish–Lithuanian forces. Known as the Grunwald Swords, they were the invitation to battle offered to the king and his ally Vytautas the Great in an ironic gesture by Ulrich von Jungingen, Grand Master of the Teutonic Order. Parks Chief Consulting Architect Aymar Embury II (1880–1966) designed the granite pedestal. POLAND is inscribed on both sides of the plinth. Ostrowski's name is engraved in the front lower right-hand corner.

History

The bronze monument was created for the 1939 New York World's Fair's Polish pavilion by the Polish sculptor Stanisław K. Ostrowski (1879–1947). It stood at the Fair's entrance at Queens' Flushing Meadows-Corona Park. It is a replica of a King Jagiello memorial in Warsaw that was converted into bullets for World War II by the Germans after they entered and occupied the capital of Poland. 

As a result of the German invasion of Poland that marked the beginning of the Second World War, the personnel and equipment of the Polish World's Fair pavilion was forced to remain in the United States. Unlike much of the rest of the pavilion which was sold to the Polish Museum of America in Chicago, the monument stayed in New York, thanks in part to mayor Fiorello H. La Guardia publicly lobbying to keep the statue. The statue was presented to the City of New York by the King Jagiello Monument Committee, with support from the Polish government in exile in July 1945, when it was permanently placed in Central Park with the cooperation of the last consul of the Second Polish Republic or pre-communist Poland in New York, count Józef Kazimierz Krasicki and unveiled by him.

The monument was conserved in 1986 by the Central Park Conservancy.

References

External links

Central Park Conservancy: King Jagiello Monument webpage
Short film showing the monument in front of Polish Pavilion at 1939 New York World's Fair

1939 sculptures
Sculptures in Central Park
Monuments and memorials in Manhattan
Outdoor sculptures in Manhattan
Polish-American culture in New York City
Equestrian statues in New York City
Bronze sculptures in Central Park